Udayanatham (East) is a village in the Udayarpalayam taluk of Ariyalur district in the Indian state of Tamil Nadu.

Administration 

The local government consists of the Jayankondam assembly constituency and the Chidambaram (Scheduled Caste) parliamentary assembly.

Education 
Government High Sec School is there.

Healthcare 
A government hospital is there.

Economy 
Government-owned businesses include State Bank Of India, Primary Agriculture Company Bank, Hand Loom Weaver Society, Rani Mahal (Marriage Hall).
Other local businesses include grocery stores, tea stalls, a hardware store, mortgage stores, a small mechanic shop, small medical facilities, and a bakery.

Temples 
 Vinayakar Temple (Near to lake)
 A/M Kathayi Amman Temple (Location - South Street)
 Samundeeswari Temple (Main Road)
 Ayyanar Temple (North)
 Mariamman Temple (Udayanatham nearby 1 km Dinakudi)
 Kaliamman Temple (Main Road)
 Sri Krishna Temple

Pujas and festivals are held on a regular basis.

References

External links 

Villages in Ariyalur district